Aegna Landscape Conservation Area is a nature park situated in Harju County, Estonia.

Its area is 303 ha.
The protected area was designated in 1991 to protect Aegna Island and its nature. In 2010, the protected area was redesigned to the landscape conservation area.

References

Nature reserves in Estonia
Geography of Harju County